Upper Denkyira East is one of the constituencies represented in the Parliament of Ghana. It elects one Member of Parliament (MP) by the first past the post system of election. The Upper Denkyira East constituency is located in the Upper Denkyira district of the Central Region of Ghana.

Boundaries
The seat is located entirely within the Upper Denkyira district of the Central Region of Ghana.

History 
The constituency was formerly the Upper Denkyira constituency. Prior to the Ghanaian parliamentary election in 2004, the Electoral Commission of Ghana created 29 new constituencies. One of these was Upper Denkyira West constituency which was carved out of the Upper Denkyira constituency leaving the now smaller Upper Denkyira East constituency.

Members of Parliament

Elections
On 29 June 2004, Benjamin Kofi Ayeh of the  New Patriotic Party (NPP) won from a field of three candidates with a majority of 20,899 to replace Charles Omar Nyanor also of the NPP. He went on to retain the seat in the 2004 parliamenary election after the boundaries were changed due to the carving out of the Upper Denkyira West constituency.

Nana Amoako, the current MP for the constituency was elected in the 2008 parliamenary election.

See also
List of Ghana Parliament constituencies
Upper Denkyira District

References 

Parliamentary constituencies in the Central Region (Ghana)